Minecraft: The Unlikely Tale of Markus "Notch" Persson and the Game That Changed Everything is a book written by Daniel Goldberg and Linus Larsson (and translated by Jennifer Hawkins) about the story of Minecraft and its creator, Markus "Notch" Persson. The book was released on October 17, 2013, and includes many different tips and tricks for the game.

Content
The book describes how Persson was inspired by games like Dungeon Keeper, Dwarf Fortress, and Infiniminer, and how he was convinced that he was onto something big from the very beginning. It also described how Persson documented the development openly and in continual dialogue with other players.

References

2013 non-fiction books
2013 in video gaming
Books about video games
Minecraft
Minecraft in popular culture
Markus Persson
Seven Stories Press books